Methanol Chemicals Company known as CHEMANOL, is a public listed company on the Saudi Stock Exchange since 2008. It was established as Saudi Formaldehyde Chemicals Company in 1989. It was the first private sector petrochemicals company in the GCC region. The company changed its name to Methanol Chemicals Company after IPO in 2008. It is a public Saudi joint-stock company with a paid-up capital of SAR 674,508,630. Located in Al Jubail Industrial City,

Chemanol has diversified from being a Formaldehyde derivatives company to a Methanol downstream complex by integrating the facility with backward integration of Methanol. It is manufacturing premium products for use in diverse applications like, Pharmaceuticals, Solvents, Intermediates, Fertilizers, Oil & Gas, Laminates/ Wood Industry, Plastics, Paper & Concrete Admixtures. The overall annual production capacity of the company reached to about one million MT. It is the largest producer of Formaldehyde & its derivates in the MENA region.

Production and major expansions

Company (Chemanol) has signed a joint venture pact with compatriot Global Company for Downstream Industries (GDI)

Products
Products are manufactured using state-of-the-art technologies and catered to over 75 countries worldwide and have earned reputation of being a world class, dependable and quality conscious.

Methanol
Aqueous Formaldehyde Solution
Urea Formaldehyde Concentrate
Hexamethylenetetramine
Paraformaldehyde
Urea Formaldehyde Powder Resin
Melamine Formaldehyde Powder Resin
Melamine Urea Formaldehyde Resin
Sulphonated Naphthalene Formaldehyde
Dimethylamine
Trimethylamine
Monomethylamine
Dimethylformamide (DMF)
Pentaerythritol
Sodium Formate

References

External links
 Chemanol’s methanol plant expansion set for completion in Q1 2023 after delays
 Methanol Chemicals Co. Announces an update regarding the non-binding Memorandum of Understanding signed with Global Company for Downstream Industries (GDI) for supplying Methanol and Exploring Future opportunities in the field of Petrochemical Products.
 Saudi Chemanol signs $133m agreement with GDI for chemical production
 Shares of Chemanol soar to all-time high following highest profit in Q1
 Saudi-listed Chemanol, GDI sign deal to set up specialty chemicals firm

1989 establishments in Saudi Arabia
Companies listed on Tadawul
Chemical companies established in 1989
Companies of Saudi Arabia